Khalipha Cele (born 19 March 1993) is a South African cricketer. He was included in the KwaZulu-Natal cricket team for the 2015 Africa T20 Cup. In September 2018, he was named in KwaZulu-Natal's squad for the 2018 Africa T20 Cup. In September 2019, he was named in KwaZulu-Natal's squad for the 2019–20 CSA Provincial T20 Cup.

References

External links
 

1993 births
Living people
People from Port Shepstone
South African cricketers
KwaZulu-Natal cricketers
Alumni of Port Shepstone High School